Argyro Strataki (born 3 August 1975 in Heraklion) is a Greek former heptathlete. She represented her country at the Olympic Games in 2004 and 2008. She was also a four-time participant at the World Championships in Athletics and a three-time competitor at the European Athletics Championships. Her personal best for the heptathlon is 6235 points – a Greek record.

Her sole major international medal was a silver at the 2005 Mediterranean Games. Strataki won six Greek title in the heptathlon from 1998 to 2006, She was also a five-time winner of the women's pentathlon at the Greek Indoor Championships.

International competitions

Personal bests

References

External links

1975 births
Living people
Greek heptathletes
Greek female athletes
Athletes (track and field) at the 2004 Summer Olympics
Athletes (track and field) at the 2008 Summer Olympics
Olympic athletes of Greece
Athletes from Heraklion
World Athletics Championships athletes for Greece
Cretan women
Mediterranean Games silver medalists for Greece
Mediterranean Games medalists in athletics
Athletes (track and field) at the 2005 Mediterranean Games